A. Germaine Golding (née Regnier; 6 June 1887 – 14 August 1973) was a French tennis player.

Career 
Golding reached the final of the 1914 World Hard Court Championships which she lost to 15-year-old Suzanne Lenglen. After World War I, she was finalist at the French national championships three times in a row from 1921, but lost to Lenglen each time. Her greatest triumph were her three titles in singles, doubles and mixed at the 1922 World Covered Court Championship at St. Moritz.

At the 1924 Summer Olympics at Paris, she lost in the semifinals against Helen Wills as well as the following match for bronze against Kathleen McKane.

After the French championships were opened for international players in 1925, Golding had problems to compete. She played at Paris for the last time in 1933 where she lost to Sylvie Jung Henrotin in the second round.

World Championships finals

Singles (1 title, 2 runners-up)

Doubles (1 title, 1 runner-up)

Mixed doubles (1 runner-up)

References

External links 
 
 

1887 births
1973 deaths
French Championships (tennis) champions
French female tennis players
Tennis players at the 1924 Summer Olympics
Olympic tennis players of France